Kulabad (also Romanized as Kūlābād; also known as Kūyābād) is a village in Silakhor Rural District, Silakhor District, Dorud County, Lorestan Province, Iran. At the 2006 census, its population was 253, in 47 families.

References 

Towns and villages in Dorud County